The Quitter is a 2014 American comedy-drama film directed by and starring Matthew Bonifacio.

Cast
Matthew Bonifacio
Deirdre O'Connell
Dan Grimaldi
Jack O'Connell
Natasha Lyonne
Julianna Gelinas Bonifacio
Destiny Money Cruz
Neil Jain

Release
The film premiered theatrically in New York City on September 12, 2014.

References

External links
 
 
 

American comedy-drama films
2014 comedy-drama films
2010s English-language films
2010s American films
English-language comedy-drama films